Brian Dean Morehouse (born July 2, 1968) is an American college basketball coach currently serving as the head coach of the Hope Flying Dutch women's basketball team. On January 25, 2020, Morehouse became the fastest college basketball coach (men's or women's) to reach 600 wins, reaching the mark in his 690th game.

Head coaching record

1. 2019-20, tournament was abandoned after two rounds because of pandemic.  Was No. 1 in final poll.
2. No NCAA postseason held due a low number of schools playing the season.  Was No. 1 all eight weeks, including the final, poll of D3Sports.com.

See also
List of college women's basketball coaches with 600 wins

Notes

References

External links
 Hope profile

1968 births
Living people
American basketball coaches
College women's basketball coaches in the United States
Hope Flying Dutch women's basketball coaches
Hope Flying Dutchmen men's basketball coaches